Wolfsgraben is a municipality in the district of St. Pölten in the Austrian state of Lower Austria.

Population

References

Cities and towns in St. Pölten-Land District
Cadastral community of St. Pölten District